Ragnheiður Gröndal or Ragga Gröndal (born 1984) is an Icelandic singer. She was described as Iceland's best-selling artist in 2006, and was named Icelandic Singer of the Year that same year. In 2007, she was a finalist in Söngvakeppni Sjónvarpsins; a competition looking for an artist to represent Iceland at the 2008 Eurovision Song Contest in Belgrade. She has collaborated with other Icelandic musicians, including the band, Ske, and Haukur Gröndal. She moved to Aalborg, Denmark in 2014.

Discography

Albums
Solo
2005: After the Rain 
2008: Bella & Her Black Coffee
2011: Astrocat Lullaby
2014: Svefnljóð
2019: Töfrabörn

Icelandic Folk Albums
2004: Vetrarljóð
2006: Þjóðlög 
2009: Tregagás

Singles
2006: "Pabbi, gefðu mér íslenskan hest" 
2014: "Svefnljóð"

References

External links
 Official website

1984 births
Living people
Ragnheidur Grondal
21st-century Icelandic women singers